Mikko Tamminen (born 20 August 1975), better known by his stage name Setä Tamu, is a Finnish rapper and record producer.

Career 
Vaasalaiset Kansiot
Mikko Tamminen started his career as a part of the group Vaasalaiset Kansiot.
 
Firevision
He first gained success through the electronic pop duo Firevision in partnership with Arttu Peljo. Firevision released its sole album The Game You Play in 2003. The album featured two charting singles; "Stars" reached number four on the Official Finnish Singles Chart while "Truth" peaked at number 17.

Kuningas Pähkinä & Setä Tamu
Since 2000, Setä Tamu has been collaborating with rapper Kuningas Pähkinä. The duo released an EP Kaikki suvussa that year, and a single "Heitä paita vittuun" followed in 2003. Their first album, Kylpyammeellinen hittejä, came out in 2004. An EP Syksyllä Palmasiin was released in 2011, and another EP, Hiitti, in 2012. In 2012 they also released their most successful single to date, "Hei Scully," which peaked at number two on the Finnish Singles Chart.

Yön Polte
Yön Polte is a group consisting of Setä Tamu, Kuningas Pähkinä and Stig. Their first single "Tyttö sinä olet meritähti" was released in February 2012, and it peaked at number seven on the Finnish Singles Chart.

Other collaborations
Tamminen has produced and/or co-written songs for other Finnish artists such as Robin, Kaija Koo and Annika Eklund. In 2012, he produced and co-wrote the Japan Hot 100 number-one song "Electric Boy" by a Korean group Kara. He co-wrote the song "Fantasy" for Taiwanese pop singer Jolin Tsai. He has also written music for Korean group Shinee.

Selected discography

Firevision
Albums

Singles

Kuningas Pähkinä & Setä Tamu
Albums

EPs
2000: Kaikki suvussa 
2011: Syksyllä Palmasiin 
2012: Hiitti 
Singles

Setä Tamu

Yön Polte

References

Living people
Finnish rappers
1975 births
Finnish songwriters